A dam was a small Indian copper coin. The coin was first introduced by Sher Shah Suri during his rule of India between 1540 and 1545, along with Mohur, the gold coin and Rupiya the silver coin. Later on, the Mughal Emperors standardised the coin along with other silver (Rupiya) and gold (Mohur) coins in order to consolidate the monetary system across India. A rupee was divided into 40 dams.

It is believed that this coin is one of the possible sources for the English phrase "I don't give a dam[n]″, due to its small worth.

See also

 Mohur 
 History of the rupee

References 

Historical currencies of India
Sur Empire
Coins